Behnam Tayyebi Kermani (born 23 July 1975 in Qaem Shahr) is a retired Iranian wrestler. He competed at the 2000 Summer Olympics in Sydney, in the men's freestyle 54 kg.

References

External links
 

1975 births
Living people
Iranian male sport wrestlers
Olympic wrestlers of Iran
Wrestlers at the 2000 Summer Olympics
Wrestlers at the 1998 Asian Games
Asian Games silver medalists for Iran
Asian Games medalists in wrestling
Medalists at the 1998 Asian Games
People from Qaem Shahr
Asian Wrestling Championships medalists
Sportspeople from Mazandaran province
20th-century Iranian people
21st-century Iranian people